José Maria Júnior (born 7 June 1943) is a former Portuguese footballer who played as a midfielder.

External links 
 
 

1943 births
Living people
Footballers from Luanda
Portuguese sportspeople of Angolan descent
Angolan emigrants to Portugal
Naturalised citizens of Portugal
Angolan footballers
Portuguese footballers
Association football midfielders
Atlético Petróleos de Luanda players
Primeira Liga players
Vitória F.C. players
North American Soccer League (1968–1984) players
Toronto Blizzard (1971–1984) players
Portugal under-21 international footballers
Portugal international footballers
Portuguese expatriate footballers
Expatriate soccer players in Canada
Portuguese expatriate sportspeople in Canada